Robert Ramsey Wiseman (18 April 1916 – 7 December 2004) was the founder of Robert Wiseman Dairies, one of the largest dairy businesses in the United Kingdom.

Career
Born at Strathaven in Lanarkshire, Robert Wiseman sold his farmland to become a designated milk distributor in East Kilbride. He used his farm horse and cart to deliver milk.

Personal life
Wiseman was married to Jean Wiseman, and together they had four sons and one daughter. Three of the sons became executives in the company.
	
His interests included bowling and curling.

References

1916 births
2004 deaths
20th-century Scottish businesspeople
People from Strathaven
Businesspeople in the dairy industry